Over time, several scoring systems for Sailing were used during the Summer Olympics. Many of these systems were also used by other regattas in their times. In order to understand how the medals in the Olympics were handed out one must have a look at the scoring system of that specific olympic sailing regatta.

From the start of sailing till the turn of the millennium one practiced the principle that the difference in points between No. 1 and 2 must be larger than between No. 2 and 3 and so on. Several systems in different variations were invented. For the last couple of Olympics this principle was no longer followed.

1900 Olympic scoring system
In 1900 for the different races different systems were used:

Olympic races at Meulan
In the following classes only one race was sailed for each gold medal.
 0 – ½ Ton
 ½ – 1 Ton
 1 – 2 Ton
 2 – 3 Ton
 3 – 10 Ton
In these races each boat was given, in advance, a handicap of several minutes and seconds. For each boat, the sailing time over the course was measured. This sailed time plus the handicap gave the corrected time. The boat with the lowest corrected time became winner.

Olympic races at Le Havre
Since in the 10 – 20 Ton a series of three races was sailed, a scoring system beside the handicap system was used. Per race one could earn points as follows:
 1st place: 10 points
 2nd place: 9 points
 3rd place: 8 points
 ...
 6th (last) place: 5 points
A disqualification of penalty gives the points of the last place minus 1. Therefore, In the Olympics with six boats competing this gives 4 points.
 All races counted and the scoring system was used after the corrected time was calculated.

Open class at Meulan
For the Open class NO handicap or scoring system was used. The order in which the boats crossed the finishing line was the result of the regatta. This with the exception of the boats that were disqualified.

In case of a tie
There are no known provisions for breaking a tie in the 1900 sailing regattas at the Olympic Games.

1908 Olympic scoring system
Three races would be scheduled in each class.
The winner is the yacht with the most 1st places

In case of a tie
In the event of three different yachts winning these Races, points will be allotted to them according to the following scale:
 1st place: 3 points
 2nd place: 2 points
 3rd place: 1 point
 4 ... no points.
The tie is broken in favor of the yacht with the most points. Should two or more winners in any class tie under these conditions, they shall sail an extra match, on a day to be appointed, and the winner of this match shall be adjudged the absolute winner of the series. 
Any tie for second place will be decided in the same manner.

1912 Olympic scoring system
In each class there will be 2 ordinary races, with the following method of scoring:
 1st place: 7 points
 2nd place: 3 points
 3rd place: 1 point
 4 ... no points.

In case of a tie
Should two or more yachts in any class tie under these conditions for one of the first 3 places overall, the yachts involved shall sail an extra race. The winner breaks the tie in its favor.

1920 Olympic scoring system
For the Games in Belgium a so-called Point for Place system was used:
 1st place: 1 point
 2nd place: 2 points
 ...
 DNF: points equal to the No. of started boats
 DNS: points equal to the No. of entered boats

In case of a tie
Should two or more yachts in any class tie under these conditions a sail-off would determine the final result.

1924 Olympic scoring system
For the 1924 Games in France system of elimination series and semi finals was used.

French National Monotype 1924
In this class a total of 17 competitors participated. The France Olympic Committee had made available a total of 8 mostly identical boats. So here the fleet was divided in two flights of eight. In each elimination series one country was exempt and was automatically qualified for the semi final. Per flight the best two boats earned a place in the semi final. Finally a sail off was held for the places 2–4.

6 & 8 Metre
In this class three elimination series were scheduled. The two best of each flight got a place in the semi final. Eventually ties were broken by the result of the final race. The result of the other boats, up to place 6, was determined by the total result of the elimination series by the point for place system.

In case of a tie
 Ties in the elimination series were not broken.
 Ties in the semi-finals were broken by the result of the elimination series.

1928 Olympic scoring system

12 Foot Dinghy 
 Each contestant participates in four events and receives a number of points corresponding to his order of arrival in his group.
 Should a contestant retire or be disqualified he shall be allowed a number of points identical with the number of starters in his group.
 Should a contestant not start he shall be allowed a number of points identical with the number of entrants in his group.
 The ten contestants obtaining the lowest number of points in the preliminary contests participate in the finals.
 The ten contestants in the finals, sail in four events in accordance with the principles laid down for the Int. 8 and 6 metres classes.

6 and 8 Metre
 Seven events are held;
 After 4 events all contestants drop out which have not been placed first, second or third at least once.
 The crew of the vessel finishing first in most events is the winner.
 Should the crew of a vessel retire or be disqualified their place in the order of merit shall be the same as the number starters.
 In the event of a crew not starting their place in the order of merit shall be the same as the number of valid entries in the respective class.

In case of a tie
 Should there be a tie as regards the first places, the number of second places obtained by those concerned shall decide which vessel is winner.
 In the event of this being a tie, the number of third places shall be the deciding factor.
 An identical system shall be applied with regard to the vessels qualifying for the second and third places, etc.

1932 Olympic scoring system
The winner in each class of the Yachting competition was decided on the following point system:
 A yacht was given one point for finishing.
 A yacht was given one point for each boat it defeated.
 The number of defeated yachts was figured on the number starting in any one race.
 A yacht that started and did not finish did not receive a point for starting, but was counted as a defeated yacht in awarding points to the other yachts.
 Where only one yacht was entered, it was necessary for her to sail over and properly complete the course in order to be awarded a place.

In case of a tie
In case of a tie after all races were sailed, provision was made for an extra race between the competitors tied.

1936 Olympic scoring system
Equal as 1932.

In case of a tie
In case of a tie after all races were sailed, provision was made for an extra race between the competitors tied. This rule only applies as it concerns the places 1, 2 or 3.

1940 Olympic scoring system
For the 1940 Olympics the following scoring system was intended:
 1st: points equal to the number of started boats + 10
 2nd: points equal to the number of started boats – 1 (+5 if four or more boats did start)
 3rd: points equal to the number of started boats – 2 (+3 if six or more boats did start)
 4th: points equal to the number of started boats – 3
 5th: points equal to the number of started boats – 4
 ...
 DNF: 3 points
 DNS: 0 points
 DSQ: 0 points

In case of a tie
In case of a tie the helmsman with the most first places wins the serie. If this does not break the tie the helmsman with the most second places wins the serie and so on. If the tie is still not broken the series goes to the helmsmen with the best result in the last race.

1948 Olympic scoring system
Until the 1932 Olympics many scoring systems were used. Most of them put a lot of weight at winning of races. This changes in Los Angeles where a point for place system was used. Still the need for awarding the winning of races remained.

In Austria a point system was developed were the delta between two sequential places was decreased with the rank. In other words: a lot of points between 1 and 2 and less difference between 24 and 25. The system was based upon a formula taking the number of entries and the rank of into account. Not finishing, retiring after the finish, disqualification or not starting gave 0 points. The formula looked like this:

N = Rank and A = Number of entries.
This formula is in the table below exercised for 1 to 25 entries.

This system was used for the 1948 Olympics. Seven races were scheduled, of the seven races, a yacht counted only the points for her best six races.

 DNF = Did Not Finish
 DNS = Did Not Start
 DSQ = Disqualified

In case of a tie
Ties were broken as follows:
 First count the number of times one boat placed ahead of the other
 The number of first places
 The number of second places and so on
 Tie breaker race

1952 Olympic scoring system
The Austrian scoring system of 1948 was used. Below you find the relevant tables:

 DNF = Did Not Finish
 DNS = Did Not Start
 DSQ = Disqualified

1956 Olympic scoring system
The Austrian scoring system of 1948 was used. Below you find the relevant tables:

 DNF = Did Not Finish
 DNS = Did Not Start
 DSQ = Disqualified

1960 Olympic scoring system
The Austrian scoring system of 1948 was used. With the exception that a yacht that did not finish now gets 101 points. Below you find the relevant tables:

 DNF = Did Not Finish
 DNS = Did Not Start
 DSQ = Disqualified

1964 Olympic scoring system
The Austrian scoring system of 1964 was used. Below you find the relevant tables:

 DNF = Did Not Finish
 DNS = Did Not Start
 DSQ = Disqualified

1968 Olympic scoring system
For each class a series should consist of seven scheduled races. For each yacht the best six races will count. If only six races are sailed the best five race will count. If only five races are sailed all five will count.
 1st place: 0 points
 2nd place: 3 points
 3rd place: 5.7 points
 4th place: 8 points
 5th place: 10 points
 6th place: 11.7 points
 All other places: Place + 6 points
 DNS: Place = No. of entered boats
 DNF: Place = No. of started boats
 DSQ: Place = No. of entered boats + 2
 RET: Place = No. of started boats

In case of a tie
In case of a tie the yacht with the most first places, over the 6 counting races for each yacht, wins the series. If this does not break the tie the helmsman with the most second places wins the series and so on. If the tie is still not broken then the tie remains.

1972 Olympic scoring system
The 1968 Olympic scoring system was used. With the exception that DSQ scored now: Place = No. of entered boats + 1

1984 Olympic scoring system
The 1968 Olympic scoring system was used. With the exception that DSQ scored now: Place = No. of entered boats + 1

Also:
RET = Place = No. of entered boats + 1
YMP = Points by decision of the jury (most used = average score)

Notes

References
 
 
 
 
 
 
 
 
 
 
 
 
 
 
 
 
 
 
 
 
 
 
 
 
 
 
 
 
 
 
 
 
 
 
 
 
 
 
 
 
 
 
 
 
 
 
 
 
 
 
 
 
 
 
 
 
 
 
 
 

Sailing at the Summer Olympics